The 5th South Carolina Regiment (1st Rifle Regiment) was raised on February 22, 1776, at Charleston, South Carolina, for service with the South Carolina Troops and later assigned to the Continental Army. The regiment saw action at the Siege of Savannah. The regiment was merged into the 1st South Carolina Regiment on February 11, 1780.

History
The following events occurred in the history of this unit:
 February 22, 1776, authorized in the South Carolina Provincial Troops
 Spring 1776, organized at Charleston to consist of seven companies from eastern and northern South Carolina. 
 March 25, 1776, adopted into the Continental Army and assigned to the Southern Department
 November 23, 1776, assigned to the 2nd South Carolina Brigade, an element of the Southern Department. 
 January 3, 1779, relieved from the 2nd South Carolina Brigade. 
 February 1, 1779, assigned to the South Carolina Brigade, an element of the Southern Department 
 May 1, 1779, relieved from the South Carolina Brigade. 
 June 15, 1779, assigned to McIntosh's Brigade, an element of the Southern Department. 
 September 14, 1779, relieved from McIntosh's Brigade
 February 11, 1780, consolidated with the 1st South Carolina Regiment

Officers
The commanders of this unit were:
 Col. Isaac Huger
 Col. John Stewart
 Lt. Col. Peter Horry

Engagements
This unit was involved in the following battles, skirmishes and sieges:
 June 28, 1776, Fort Moultrie
 August 1, 1776, Seneca Town
 August 8-11, 1776, Cherokee Towns
 December 29, 1778, Siege of Savannah, Georgia
 February 3, 1779, Port Royal Island
 May 3, 1779, Coosawhatchie
 May 11, 1779, Charleston Neck
 June 20, 1779 Battle of Stono Ferry
 September 16 - Oct. 18, 1779, Siege of Savannah, Georgia

See also
 List of South Carolina militia units in the American Revolution
 South Carolina Line: 1st, 2nd, 3rd, 4th, 5th, 6th Regiments

References

External links
Bibliography of the Continental Army in South Carolina compiled by the United States Army Center of Military History

South Carolina regiments of the Continental Army
Military units and formations established in 1776
Military units and formations disestablished in 1780